Barbi may refer to:

 Barbi (name), including a list of people with the name
 Barbi trilogy, three Philippine comedy films, including Run Barbi Run, 1995
 Barbi3, a 2008 Indonesian film
 Carrozzeria Barbi, an Italian bus manufacturer

See also
 Barbie (disambiguation)
 Barbee (disambiguation)
 Barbey (disambiguation)
 Barby (disambiguation)
 Barbe (disambiguation)